Hawaiian Ocean View (usually referred to as "Ocean View") is a census-designated place (CDP) in Hawaii County, Hawaii, United States located in the District of Kaū. It includes the subdivisions of Hawaiian Ocean View Estates (HOVE), Hawaiian Ocean View Ranchos, Kahuku Country Gardens, Kula Kai View Estates, Kona Gardens, Keone's Ranchos, and Kona View Estates. The population was 4,437 at the 2010 census, up from 2,178 at the 2000 census.

History
The HOVE development consisted of 10,697  lots north of the Hawaii Belt Road in the western part of the District of Kaū. The terrain varies from rugged lava fields to ohia trees and other vegetation. Elevation ranges from about  up to the  level. Initial sales began in the late 1950s. The original developer of HOVE was the Crawford Oil Company. Later, other subdivisions were put in place downslope of HOVE and the Hawaii Belt Road. In the early 1980s a service station and a hardware store were built.

In 1989 the Ocean View Town Center was developed, and the Ocean View Road Maintenance Corporation began an extensive rebuilding program of the roads. Shortly thereafter the Ocean View Development Corporation started a new market which included a laundromat and restaurant. Ocean View now has two shopping centers. There are now three gas stations, two grocery stores, and an L & L Hawaiian BBQ restaurant.

In January 2004, Hawaii Volcanoes National Park purchased the nearby property previously known as Kahuku Ranch.

Ocean View has a post office with the ZIP code of 96737.  The USPS does not provide street delivery of mail except on Mamalahoa Highway. It is, therefore, difficult to get confirmation of a Street address for mail order companies to send purchases.

Geography
Ocean View is located at the southern end of the island of Hawaii at  (19.107649, -155.767186), on the southwest rift zone of the shield volcano Mauna Loa.

Hawaii Route 11 passes through the community, leading northeast  to Hilo and northwest  to Kailua-Kona.

The area is prone to earthquakes.

Climate

Demographics

As of the census of 2000, there were 2,178 people, 941 households, and 541 families residing in the CDP.  The population density was 21.4 people per square mile (8.2/km2).  There were 1,382 housing units at an average density of 13.5 per square mile (5.2/km2).  The racial makeup of the CDP was 56.75% White, 1.01% African American, 1.10% Native American, 6.34% Asian, 11.02% Pacific Islander, 1.97% from other races, and 21.81% from two or more races. Hispanic or Latino of any race were 8.40% of the population.

There were 941 households, out of which 25.0% had children under the age of 18 living with them, 42.1% were married couples living together, 9.6% had a female householder with no husband present, and 42.5% were non-families. 33.7% of all households were made up of individuals, and 7.3% had someone living alone who was 65 years of age or older.  The average household size was 2.31 and the average family size was 2.97.

In the CDP the population was spread out, with 24.6% under the age of 18, 4.3% from 18 to 24, 25.4% from 25 to 44, 33.0% from 45 to 64, and 12.8% who were 65 years of age or older.  The median age was 43 years. For every 100 females, there were 113.5 males.  For every 100 females age 18 and over, there were 117.6 males.

The median income for a household in the CDP was $26,125, and the median income for a family was $34,234. Males had a median income of $28,523 versus $20,938 for females. The per capita income for the CDP was $15,218.  About 13.0% of families and 25.2% of the population were below the poverty line, including 32.3% of those under age 18 and 16.5% of those age 65 or over.

References

External links
HOVE Road Maintenance Corporation

Census-designated places in Hawaii County, Hawaii
Populated places on Hawaii (island)